Lac La Belle may refer to:

Communities
Lac La Belle, Michigan, an unincorporated community
Lac La Belle, Wisconsin, a village
Lake Lac La Belle, Wisconsin, an unincorporated community and former CDP

Waterbodies
Lac La Belle (Michigan), a lake